Walter Bowler (23 August 1884 – 19 March 1955) was a Canadian rower. He competed in the men's single sculls event at the 1908 Summer Olympics.

References

Further reading
 
 
 

1884 births
1955 deaths
Canadian male rowers
Olympic rowers of Canada
Rowers at the 1908 Summer Olympics
Place of birth missing